Sergiyevka is a rural locality (a selo) and the administrative center of Sergiyevsky Selsoviet, Ikryaninsky District, Astrakhan Oblast, Russia. The population was 372 as of 2010. There are 3 streets.

Geography 
Sergiyevka is located 18 km south of Ikryanoye (the district's administrative centre) by road. Troitsky is the nearest rural locality.

References 

Rural localities in Ikryaninsky District